Electric Youth may refer to:

 Electric Youth (band), a Canadian synthpop duo
 Electric Youth (album), a 1989 album by Debbie Gibson
 "Electric Youth" (song)
 Electric Youth (fragrance)